Sonata for Two Pianos may refer to:
 Sonata for Two Pianos and Percussion (Bartok)
 Sonata for Two Pianos (Goeyvaerts)
 Sonata for Two Pianos (Mozart)
 Sonata for Two Pianos (Stravinsky)
 Sonata for Two Pianos (Tailleferre)